John Millar may refer to:

John Millar (philosopher) (1735–1801), Scottish philosopher and historian
John Millar, Lord Craighill (1817–1888), Scottish judge
John A. Millar (1855–1915), New Zealand politician
John Millar (Canadian politician) (1866–1950)
John Millar (footballer, born 1923) (1923–1986), Scottish footballer
John Millar (footballer, born 1927) (1927–1991), Scottish footballer
John Millar (footballer, born 1966), Scottish footballer (Chelsea, Blackburn Rovers, Heart of Midlothian)
John Millar (rugby union), Scottish rugby union player
John Millar, Scottish confectioner, see Millar McCowan
John Millar, American spiritual head of Elohim City, Oklahoma
Sandy Millar (John Alexander Kirkpatrick Millar, born 1939), Anglican bishop
John Millar, musician in The Hush Now

See also
John Miller (disambiguation)
John Millar Andrews (1871–1956), Prime Minister of Northern Ireland
John Millar Watt (1895–1975), Scottish artist